Ruizia is a monotypic genus of flowering plants belonging to the family Malvaceae, containing the single species Ruizia cordata. Its native range is Réunion.

The genus is named for Spanish botanist Hipólito Ruiz López (1754–1815).

References

Dombeyoideae
Malvaceae genera
Monotypic Malvales genera
Endemic flora of Réunion
Taxa named by Antonio José Cavanilles